Tholera hilaris is a species of moth of the family Noctuidae. It is found from the southern part of European Russia to the Caucasus region, Transcaucasia, Turkey and Israel.

Adults are on wing from September to October. There is one generation per year.

External links
 Hadeninae of Israel

Hadeninae
Insects of Turkey
Moths of the Middle East